Engelsberg–Norbergs Järnväg, the Engelsberg–Norberg Railway, is a  railway between Ängelsberg and Kärrgruvan in the province of Västmanland in Sweden, now being used by the Engelsbergs Norberg Järnvägshistoriska förening (ENJ), a heritage railway association.

History
Transport of goods on the first part of the line, Kärrgruvan – Trättbo begun in December 1853 with the first steam engine built in Sweden, Förstlingen (the First One), constructed by the Munktell Mechanical Workshops in Eskilstuna. A reconstructed company,  Norbergs Nya Järnvägs AB  was formed in 1855 and finished the whole line to Ängelsberg at the lake of Åmänningen in 1856. At that time the railway had a  gauge, widened to the Swedish  in 1876.

In 1962 passenger service was discontinued, followed by freight services in the mid 1990s.

The Heritage Railway Association
Engelsbergs Norberg Järnvägshistoriska förening (ENJ), the Engelsberg-Norberg Heritage Railway Association, started in 1999, aims to organize regular traffic for tourists with diesel railcars between  Ängelsberg and Kärrgruvan. The association has two locomotive sheds, including a roundhouse and turntable at Ängelsberg and a shed at Kärrgruvan. The latter was built in 1857 and is the oldest preserved locomotive shed in Sweden.

ENJ uses three 1950s railcars for regular traffic:
The Multiple Unit YBo7 No 1156, constructed 1957 by ASJ, Östersund
The Multiple Unit YBo7 No 1255, constructed 1959 by Eksjö-verken, Eksjö
The Control Unit Ybfoby No 2076

ENJ also has other stock for permanent way and maintenance use, including:
0-4-0DM Deutz 'Grodan' (Frog), in green

As well as various coaching stock awaiting restoration in the sidings at Kärrgruvan. ENJ's long term hopes are to run a summer steam service on the line, and has secured these coaches to be used when appropriate motive power becomes available. For now, the railcars provide the backbone of the service.

Photo gallery

References

Note
This article is based on the article about the Engelsberg-Norbergs Järnväg in the Swedish language Wikipedia.

External links
 http://www.enj.se Officiell hemsida för Engelsbergs Norberg Järnvägshistoriska förening (in Swedish)

Heritage railways in Sweden
Railway museums in Sweden
Museums in Västmanland County
Narrow gauge railways in Sweden